The 1994 French Supertouring Championship was the twentieth season of the French Supertouring Championship. The season began in Nogaro on 4 April and finished in Lédenon on 23 October. The championship was won by Laurent Aïello driving a Peugeot 405 for the Peugeot Talbot Sport.

Teams and drivers

Race calendar and results

Drivers' Championship

Manufacturers' Trophy

Privateers' Championship

External links 
1993 Drivers List
1993 Standings

Seasons in touring car racing
French Supertouring Championship